Warren Newcombe (April 28, 1894 – August 3, 1960) was an American special effects artist. He won two Academy Awards for Best Special Effects and was nominated for another one in the same category. He worked on more than 200 films during his career.

Selected filmography
Newcombe won two Academy Awards for Best Special Effects and was nominated for another one:

Won
 Thirty Seconds Over Tokyo (1944)
 Green Dolphin Street (1947)

Nominated
 Mrs. Miniver (1942)

References

External links

1894 births
1960 deaths
Special effects people
Best Visual Effects Academy Award winners
People from Waltham, Massachusetts